The twelfth series of Made in Chelsea, a British structured-reality television programme began airing on 10 October 2016 on E4, and concluded on 26 December 2016 following eleven episodes and a "Christmas Party" special episode hosted by Rick Edwards. This series also featured the return of former cast members Fred Ferrier and Oliver Proudlock having last appeared in the fourth and tenth series respectively. New cast members for this series include Emily Blackwell, Julius Cowdrey and Nick Summerfield, as well as Akin Solanke-Caulker, who is the first black cast member to feature in the show. This is the final series to include Jess Woodley. This series focused heavily on the divide between the girls as Tiff and Toff's ongoing feud continued, until they eventually made up much to the distress of Toff's best friend Jess. As well as this, the start of Olivia and Fred's new romance is included in this series.

Cast

Episodes

{| class="wikitable plainrowheaders" style="width:100%; background:#fff;"
! style="background:#F3F781;"| Seriesno.
! style="background:#F3F781;"| Episodeno.
! style="background:#F3F781;"| Title
! style="background:#F3F781;"| Original air date
! style="background:#F3F781;"| Duration
! style="background:#F3F781;"| UK viewers

|}

Ratings

External links

References

2016 British television seasons
Made in Chelsea seasons